Mbangwe (Mbaŋwe, Mbahouin) is a Bantu language spoken in Gabon and the Congo.

References

Kele languages